The Electoral district of Counties of Hunter, Brisbane and Bligh and from 1851, Phillip, Brisbane and Bligh, was an electorate of the partially elected New South Wales Legislative Council, created for the first elections for the Council in 1843. The electoral district included the north western counties of Hunter, Brisbane, Bligh. Polling took place in the towns of Jerrys Plains, nearby Merton, Muswellbrook,  Scone, as far north as Murrurundi, Watson's on the Macdonald River, Cassilis and as far west as Montefiores. With the expansion of the Council in 1851 Phillip, the other north west county, was added to the district, replacing Hunter which was combined with the lower Hunter county of Northumberland as Counties of Northumberland and Hunter.

In 1856 the unicameral Legislative Council was abolished and replaced with an elected Legislative Assembly and an appointed Legislative Council. The district was represented by the Legislative Assembly Phillip, Brisbane and Bligh.

Members

Election results

1843

1848

1851

References

Former electoral districts of New South Wales Legislative Council
1843 establishments in Australia
1851 disestablishments in Australia